The 2015 Asian Rowing Championships were the 16th Asian Rowing Championships and took place from 24 to 28 September 2015, in Shunyi Olympic Rowing-Canoeing Park, Beijing, China.

Medal summary

Men

Women

Medal table

References

External links
Asian Rowing Fedeation

Rowing Championships
Asian
Asian Rowing Championships
International sports competitions hosted by China
September 2015 sports events in China